Skouedhirraad is a genus of ground beetles in the family Carabidae. There are at least two described species in Skouedhirraad, found in India.

Species
These two species belong to the genus Skouedhirraad:
 Skouedhirraad kucerai Morvan, 2004
 Skouedhirraad sikkimensis Morvan, 1999

References

Platyninae